2,4-Xylidine is an organic compound with the formula C6H3(CH3)2NH2. It is one of several isomeric xylidines.  It is a colorless viscous liquid.  Commercially significant derivatives include the veterinary drug cymiazole and the colorant Pigment Yellow 81.

It is prepared by nitration of m-xylene followed by hydrogenation.

References

Anilines